Kansas's 9th Senate district is one of 40 districts in the Kansas Senate. It has been represented by Republican Julia Lynn since 2005; Lynn will be succeeded by fellow Republican Beverly Gossage in 2021.

Geography
District 9 covers central and northwestern Johnson County in the suburbs of Kansas City, including all of De Soto and parts of Olathe, Lenexa, and Gardner.

The district is located entirely within Kansas's 3rd congressional district, and overlaps with the 14th, 15th, 26th, 30th, 38th, 43rd, 49th, and 121st districts of the Kansas House of Representatives.

Recent election results

2020
After winning the Republican primary unopposed, incumbent Julia Lynn dropped her 2020 bid for re-election citing her sister's health, and was replaced on the Republican line by Beverly Gossage.

2016

2012

Federal and statewide results in District 9

References

9
Johnson County, Kansas